is a Japanese four-panel manga series written and illustrated by Rurū Minase. A 12-episode anime television series adaptation by Seven Arcs Pictures aired from January 10 to March 27, 2016.

Plot
A young man, Maeda, moves into a new apartment, only to find that his new landlady, Chie, is a middle schooler.

Characters

Residents of the apartment

Chie's friends

Chie's classmate

Media

Manga
Rurū Minase began publishing the series in Houbunsha's Manga Time magazine in 2012. The manga is also serialized in the publisher's Manga Time Family magazine, starting in January 2014. The series has been collected into ten tankōbon volumes.

Volumes

Anime
An anime adaptation was announced on 17 September 2015, and aired on TV in January 2016. The anime was directed by Yuki Ogawa, with animation by the animation studio Seven Arcs Pictures. Character designs were produced by Atsuki Shimizu, who also served as animation director. The series' music is composed by Arte Refact and produced by King Records and bilibili. It aired on Tokyo MX and Sun TV between 10 January 2016 to 27 March 2016. The series was simulcast worldwide on Crunchyroll.

Episode list

References

External links

  
 

Anime series based on manga
Houbunsha manga
Comedy anime and manga
Yonkoma
Seven Arcs
Seinen manga